John Monson, 11th Baron Monson (3 May 1932 – 12 February 2011), was a British hereditary peer and crossbench member of the House of Lords. He was one of the ninety hereditary peers elected to remain in the House after the passing of the House of Lords Act 1999. He was a civil liberties campaigner and president of the Society for Individual Freedom.

The son of John Monson, 10th Baron Monson, and Bettie Northrup Powell, he was educated at Eton College in Berkshire and at Trinity College, Cambridge, where he graduated with a B.A. degree in 1954. In 1958 Monson succeeded to his father's barony.

Monson married Emma Devas, daughter of Anthony Devas and Nicolette Macnamara, on 2 April 1955. The couple had three sons, including Nicholas who succeeded him.  Nicholas's son, Alexander, died while in police custody in Kenya in May 2012 (according to a 2018 Kenyan court ruling, was murdered by police).

References

Sources

External links

1932 births
2011 deaths
Alumni of Trinity College, Cambridge
Crossbench hereditary peers
People educated at Eton College
John 11

Hereditary peers elected under the House of Lords Act 1999